Norwood is a borough in Bergen County, in the U.S. state of New Jersey. As of the 2020 United States census, the borough's population was 5,641, a decrease of 70 (−1.2%) from the 2010 census count of 5,711, which in turn reflected a decline of 40 (−0.7%) from the 5,751 counted in the 2000 census.

Norwood was formed as a borough by an act of the New Jersey Legislature on March 14, 1905, from portions of Harrington Township.

History
The territory comprising Norwood was originally settled about 1686 by a dozen or more families mostly from the Dutch Republic, who purchased the land under the Tappan Patent. About that time a grant was also given by Philip Carteret, Governor of the Province of East Jersey, during the reign of King Charles II of England. The Lenni Lenape Native Americans roamed the valley.

The name Norwood emanated from the old description of its location in the "North-Woods". It was a part of Harrington Township, which was formed in 1775 from the northernmost portions of Hackensack Township and New Barbadoes Township, stretching from the Hudson River in the east to the Saddle River in the west.

In 1840, the portions of Harrington Township west of the Hackensack River were taken away to create Washington Township. At that time, Norwood, Northvale (once called Neuvy), Old Tappan, Demarest, Closter and Harrington Park were communities within Harrington Township.

On March 14, 1905, Norwood seceded from its parent Harrington Township and was incorporated as an independent borough.

Geography
According to the United States Census Bureau, the borough had a total area of 2.79 square miles (7.24 km2), including 2.79 square miles (7.21 km2) of land and 0.01 square miles (0.02 km2) of water (0.32%).

It is bordered by the Bergen County municipalities of Alpine, Closter, Harrington Park, Northvale, Old Tappan and Rockleigh.

Unincorporated communities, localities and place names within the borough include West Norwood.

Demographics

2010 census

The Census Bureau's 2006–2010 American Community Survey showed that (in 2010 inflation-adjusted dollars) median household income was $102,132 (with a margin of error of +/− $9,413) and the median family income was $107,356 (+/− $10,538). Males had a median income of $80,837 (+/− $8,419) versus $56,429 (+/− $15,763) for females. The per capita income for the borough was $38,755 (+/− $5,524). About 0.6% of families and 1.3% of the population were below the poverty line, including 0.9% of those under age 18 and 0.9% of those age 65 or over.

2000 census
As of the 2000 United States census there were 5,751 people, 1,857 households, and 1,563 families residing in the borough. The population density was 2,091.4 people per square mile (807.4/km2). There were 1,888 housing units at an average density of 686.6 per square mile (265.1/km2). The racial makeup of the borough was 77.86% Caucasian, 18.99% Asian, 0.83% African American, 0.02% Native American, 0.94% from other races, and 1.36% from two or more races. Hispanics or Latinos of any race were 2.99% of the population.

As of the 2000 Census, 12.69% of Norwood's residents identified themselves as being of Korean ancestry, which was the eighth highest in the United States and sixth highest of any municipality in New Jersey, for all places with 1,000 or more residents identifying their ancestry.

There were 1,857 households, out of which 41.5% had children under the age of 18 living with them, 73.8% were married couples living together, 7.8% had a female householder with no husband present, and 15.8% were non-families. 13.7% of all households were made up of individuals, and 6.0% had someone living alone who was 65 years of age or older. The average household size was 2.97 and the average family size was 3.26.

In the borough the population was spread out, with 25.8% under the age of 18, 5.4% from 18 to 24, 26.9% from 25 to 44, 26.4% from 45 to 64, and 15.6% who were 65 years of age or older. The median age was 41 years. For every 100 females, there were 88.7 males. For every 100 females age 18 and over, there were 84.4 males.

The median income for a household in the borough was $92,447, and the median income for a family was $100,329. Males had a median income of $70,000 versus $37,059 for females. The per capita income for the borough was $40,039. About 2.3% of families and 4.9% of the population were below the poverty line, including 6.4% of those under age 18 and 2.9% of those age 65 or over.

Government

Local government
Norwood is governed under the Borough form of New Jersey municipal government, which is used in 218 municipalities (of the 564) statewide, making it the most common form of government in New Jersey. The governing body is comprised of a Mayor and a Borough Council, with all positions elected at-large on a partisan basis as part of the November general election. A Mayor is elected directly by the voters to a four-year term of office. The Borough Council is comprised of six members elected to serve three-year terms on a staggered basis, with two seats coming up for election each year in a three-year cycle. The Borough form of government used by Norwood is a "weak mayor / strong council" government in which council members act as the legislative body with the mayor presiding at meetings and voting only in the event of a tie. The mayor can veto ordinances subject to an override by a two-thirds majority vote of the council. The mayor makes committee and liaison assignments for council members, and most appointments are made by the mayor with the advice and consent of the council.

, the Mayor of Norwood is Republican James P. Barsa, whose term of office ends December 31, 2023. Members of the Borough Council are Council President Annie Hausman (D, 2023), Joseph Ascolese (R, 2024), Thomas L. Brizzolara (D, 2024), Edward P. Condoleo (R, 2025),  Anthony Foschino (R, 2025) and Bong June "BJ" Kim (R, 2023).

Ermin Suljic was appointed in July 2022 to fill the seat expiring in December 2022 that had become vacant following the resignation of John Rooney.

In November 2018, the Borough Council selected Anthony Foschino from a list of candidates nominated by the Republican municipal committee to fill the vacant seat expiring in December 2019 that had been held by Frank Marino. In the November 2019 general election, Foschino was elected to serve the balance of the term of office.

Federal, state and county representation
Norwood is located in the 5th Congressional District and is part of New Jersey's 39th state legislative district.

Politics
As of March 2011, there were a total of 3,518 registered voters in Norwood, of which 961 (27.3% vs. 31.7% countywide) were registered as Democrats, 728 (20.7% vs. 21.1%) were registered as Republicans and 1,829 (52.0% vs. 47.1%) were registered as Unaffiliated. There were no voters registered to other parties. Among the borough's 2010 Census population, 61.6% (vs. 57.1% in Bergen County) were registered to vote, including 80.1% of those ages 18 and over (vs. 73.7% countywide).

In the 2016 presidential election, Democrat Hillary Clinton received 1,415 votes (50.5% vs. 54.8% countywide), ahead of Republican Donald Trump with 1,249 votes (44.6% vs. 41.6%) and other candidates with 89 votes (3.2% vs. 3.0%), among the 2,801 ballots cast by the borough's 3,824 registered voters, for a turnout of 73.2% (vs. 72.5% in Bergen County). In the 2012 presidential election, Republican Mitt Romney received 1,296 votes (49.8% vs. 43.5% countywide), ahead of Democrat Barack Obama with 1,275 votes (49.0% vs. 54.8%) and other candidates with 18 votes (0.7% vs. 0.9%), among the 2,604 ballots cast by the borough's 3,683 registered voters, for a turnout of 70.7% (vs. 70.4% in Bergen County). In the 2008 presidential election, Republican John McCain received 1,458 votes (50.3% vs. 44.5% countywide), ahead of Democrat Barack Obama with 1,389 votes (47.9% vs. 53.9%) and other candidates with 25 votes (0.9% vs. 0.8%), among the 2,897 ballots cast by the borough's 3,761 registered voters, for a turnout of 77.0% (vs. 76.8% in Bergen County). In the 2004 presidential election, Republican George W. Bush received 1,461 votes (51.9% vs. 47.2% countywide), ahead of Democrat John Kerry with 1,317 votes (46.8% vs. 51.7%) and other candidates with 25 votes (0.9% vs. 0.7%), among the 2,813 ballots cast by the borough's 3,766 registered voters, for a turnout of 74.7% (vs. 76.9% in the whole county).

In the 2013 gubernatorial election, Republican Chris Christie received 66.7% of the vote (966 cast), ahead of Democrat Barbara Buono with 31.7% (459 votes), and other candidates with 1.7% (24 votes), among the 1,486 ballots cast by the borough's 3,510 registered voters (37 ballots were spoiled), for a turnout of 42.3%. In the 2009 gubernatorial election, Republican Chris Christie received 1,031 votes (52.7% vs. 45.8% countywide), ahead of Democrat Jon Corzine with 803 votes (41.0% vs. 48.0%), Independent Chris Daggett with 92 votes (4.7% vs. 4.7%) and other candidates with 11 votes (0.6% vs. 0.5%), among the 1,957 ballots cast by the borough's 3,630 registered voters, yielding a 53.9% turnout (vs. 50.0% in the county).

Education
The Norwood Public School District serves students in kindergarten through eighth grade at Norwood Public School. As of the 2018–19 school year, the district, comprised of one school, had an enrollment of 618 students and 48.5 classroom teachers (on an FTE basis), for a student–teacher ratio of 12.7:1.

Students in public school for ninth through twelfth grades attend Northern Valley Regional High School at Old Tappan, together with students from Harrington Park, Northvale and Old Tappan, along with students from Rockleigh who attend the high school as part of a sending/receiving relationship. The school is one of the two schools of the Northern Valley Regional High School District, which also serves students from the neighboring communities of Closter, Demarest and Haworth at the Northern Valley Regional High School at Demarest. During the 1994–1996 school years, Northern Valley Regional High School at Old Tappan was awarded the Blue Ribbon School Award of Excellence by the United States Department of Education. As of the 2018–19 school year, the high school had an enrollment of 1,170 students and 97.9 classroom teachers (on an FTE basis), for a student–teacher ratio of 12.0:1. Seats on the high school district's nine-member board of education are allocated based on the population of the constituent municipalities, with one seat allocated to Norwood.

Public school students from the borough, and all of Bergen County, are eligible to attend the secondary education programs offered by the Bergen County Technical Schools, which include the Bergen County Academies in Hackensack, and the Bergen Tech campus in Teterboro or Paramus. The district offers programs on a shared-time or full-time basis, with admission based on a selective application process and tuition covered by the student's home school district.

Transportation

Roads and highways

Public transportation
Rockland Coaches provides service on routes 20/20T to the Port Authority Bus Terminal in Midtown Manhattan.

Saddle River Tours / Ameribus offered service on the 20 / 84 route to the George Washington Bridge Bus Station.

Wildlife
The forests in Norwood house many deciduous species, sheltering deer, wild turkey, turtles, foxes, rabbits, and even coyote. Suburban sprawl is beginning to interfere with the wildlife. Deer and auto collisions as well as coyote and human interaction is a problem.

Notable people

People who were born in, residents of, or otherwise closely associated with Norwood include:

 Kenny Anderson (born 1970), basketball player who began his NBA career with the New Jersey Nets
 Ray Barretto (1929–2006), percussionist and bandleader
 Colleen Broomall (born 1983), actress and journalist
 Devin Fuller (born 1994), wide receiver who played for the Atlanta Falcons of the National Football League
 Jordan Fuller (born 1998), American football safety for the Los Angeles Rams
 Bruce Harper (born 1955), former running back for the New York Jets
 Catfish Hunter (1946–1999), pitcher who played for the Kansas City / Oakland A's and New York Yankees
 Walter H. Jones (1912–1982), politician who served in the New Jersey Senate and was a candidate for Governor of New Jersey
 Don Mattingly (born 1961), manager of the Los Angeles Dodgers who lived in the borough while playing for the New York Yankees
 Bob McGrath  (1932–2022), actor, singer, musician, and children's author best known for playing original human character Bob Johnson on the long running educational television series Sesame Street. 
 Frank Messina (born ), poet and author
 Gene Michael (1938–2017), former player, manager and executive in Major League Baseball
 Thurman Munson (1947–1979), former baseball player who played catcher for the New York Yankees
 Graig Nettles (born 1944), former baseball player who played third base for the New York Yankees
 Dianna Russini (born 1983), sports journalist on ESPN
 Julian Sanchez (born 1979), libertarian writer and journalist
 Pamela Redmond Satran (born 1953), author
 Abi Varghese, director and writer, best known for his Netflix released show Brown Nation

See also

 List of U.S. cities with significant Korean-American populations
 Chodae Community Church – By 2000, the congregation had grown to 700 members and the church sought approval from the borough for the construction of a $5 million,  facility on a  site that would include a sanctuary large enough to accommodate 720 worshipers. A local citizens group, the Norwood Civic Association was created to oppose church's plans, with more than one-third of all resident families joining the organization, which argued that the size of the proposed church would cause flooding and cause congestion on Sundays, given the proximity between the proposed site and the borough's athletic complex.

References

Sources 

 Municipal Incorporations of the State of New Jersey (according to Counties) prepared by the Division of Local Government, Department of the Treasury (New Jersey); December 1, 1958.
 Clayton, W. Woodford; and Nelson, William. History of Bergen and Passaic Counties, New Jersey, with Biographical Sketches of Many of its Pioneers and Prominent Men., Philadelphia: Everts and Peck, 1882.
 Harvey, Cornelius Burnham (ed.), Genealogical History of Hudson and Bergen Counties, New Jersey. New York: New Jersey Genealogical Publishing Co., 1900.
 Van Valen, James M. History of Bergen County, New Jersey. New York: New Jersey Publishing and Engraving Co., 1900.
 Westervelt, Frances A. (Frances Augusta), 1858–1942, History of Bergen County, New Jersey, 1630–1923, Lewis Historical Publishing Company, 1923.

External links

 Borough of Norwood official website
 Norwood Public School
 
 School Data for the Norwood Public School, National Center for Education Statistics
 Northern Valley Regional High School District

 
1905 establishments in New Jersey
Borough form of New Jersey government
Boroughs in Bergen County, New Jersey
Populated places established in 1905